Walter Horak (1 June 1931 – 24 December 2019) was an Austrian football player.

Club career
Horak played for several clubs, including Austria Wien, SC Wacker Wien, Grazer AK, and FC Sochaux (France). But with Wiener Sport Club he won two league titles and he topped the final goalscorers chart once.

International career
He made his debut for Austria in November 1954 against Hungary and was a participant at the 1958 FIFA World Cup and the 1960 European Nations' Cup where he scored against France. He earned 13 caps, scoring 3 goals.

Honours
Austrian Football Bundesliga (3):
 1958, 1959, 1962
Austrian Cup (1):
 1962
Austrian Bundesliga Top Goalscorer (1):
 1958

References

External links
  Austria Wien archive

1931 births
2019 deaths
Austrian footballers
Austria international footballers
1958 FIFA World Cup players
FK Austria Wien players
FC Sochaux-Montbéliard players
Grazer AK players
Austrian expatriate footballers
Expatriate footballers in France
Ligue 1 players
Austrian Football Bundesliga players
Association football forwards